Bingham Lake is a lake in Cottonwood County, Minnesota, in the United States.

The lake was named for Kinsley S. Bingham, a U.S. Senator, and the 11th Governor of the State of Michigan.

See also
List of lakes in Minnesota

References

Lakes of Minnesota
Lakes of Cottonwood County, Minnesota